{{Drugbox
| Verifiedfields = changed
| verifiedrevid = 451323614
| IUPAC_name = N,N-Dimethyl-N′-pyridin-2-yl-''N-(3-thienylmethyl)ethane-1,2-diamine
| image = Thenyldiamine skeletal.svg

| tradename =  
| pregnancy_category =  
| legal_status =  
| routes_of_administration =  

| bioavailability =  
| protein_bound =  
| metabolism =  
| elimination_half-life =  
| excretion =  

| CAS_number_Ref = 
| CAS_number = 91-79-2
| ATC_prefix = none
| ATC_suffix =  
| PubChem = 7066
| UNII_Ref = 
| UNII = E4U52363JE
| ChemSpiderID_Ref = 
| ChemSpiderID      = 6799

| C=14 | H=19 | N=3 | S=1 
| smiles = CN(C)CCN(CC1=CSC=C1)C2=CC=CC=N2
| StdInChI_Ref = 
| StdInChI          = 1S/C14H19N3S/c1-16(2)8-9-17(11-13-6-10-18-12-13)14-5-3-4-7-15-14/h3-7,10,12H,8-9,11H2,1-2H3
| StdInChIKey_Ref = 
| StdInChIKey       = RCGYDFVCAAKKNG-UHFFFAOYSA-N
}}Thenyldiamine''' is an antihistamine and anticholinergic.

References 

Thiophenes
Aminopyridines
H1 receptor antagonists